Lucy Allais is a philosopher who holds academic positions at both the University of the Witwatersrand and Johns Hopkins University. Her research interests include the philosophy of Immanuel Kant as well as forgiveness, punishment, and bioethics.

Education and career
Allais received an undergraduate degree in philosophy and art history from the University of the Witwatersrand (Wits), Johannesburg, moving on to gain both a masters (B.Phil.) and D.Phil. at the University of Oxford. Following her D.Phil., Allais taught for three years at Oxford, before moving  to the University of Sussex in 2004. Between 2006 and 2008 Dr. Allais taught at the University of Witwatersrand. Beginning in 2008, Allais held a joint position between the University of the Witwatersrand, where she is now a full professor,  and the University of Sussex. In 2014 she moved from Sussex to the University of California, San Diego, as the Henry E. Allison Chair of the History of Philosophy, keeping her joint appointment at the Witwatersrand.  She left UCSD for Johns Hopkins in 2021.

References

Living people
21st-century South African philosophers
Metaphysicians
Academics of the University of Sussex
Academic staff of the University of the Witwatersrand
University of the Witwatersrand alumni
University of California, San Diego faculty
South African women philosophers
Year of birth missing (living people)
Alumni of the University of Oxford